The Clayton County Public School District (CCPS) is a fully Cognia accredited public school district headquartered in Jonesboro, Georgia, U.S. It administers schools inside of Clayton County, Georgia. Serving more than 52,000 students, Clayton County Public Schools is ranked among the 100 largest school districts in the U.S. and is the fifth-largest school system in Georgia.

The system has 39 primary/elementary schools (including one public charter), 17 middle schools (including one public charter), 12 high schools, one alternative education center, one psychological education center, and one multi-purpose education center.  Included in this number are five school-wide magnet schools, 12 magnet programs, one state-certified STEM program, one Cognia (AdvancED) certified STEM program, and two International Baccalaureate Candidate schools. 

The majority of Clayton County's students are African American and Hispanic. However, there is also a diverse minority with 90 different ethnicities and countries represented. 

Based the National Center For Education Statistics, 23% of CCPS students live in families making income below the poverty line, and 47% live with single parents.

As of the 2019-2020 school year, over 12,000 students speak a language other than English and over 6,000 are counted as English language learners. Spanish and Vietnamese are the two most spoken languages besides English.

Board of Education 
As of March 31, 2022 the Clayton County Public School Board of Education representatives are:
Jasmine Bowles- District 1
Mark Christmas- District 2
Jessie Goree, Board Chair - District 3
Victoria Williams- District 4
Dr. Deatrice "Dee " Haney- District 5
Mary Baker - District 6
Sabrina Hill- District 7
Joy Tellis Cooper - District 8
Benjamin Straker Sr., Board Vice-Chair- District 9

Current Superintendent - Dr. Morcease J. Beasley
Dr. Morcease J. Beasley (2017–present) was elected by the Clayton County Board of Education on May 8, 2017 to serve as Superintendent of Clayton County Public Schools.  Prior to his appointment, Dr. Beasley served as Clayton County Public Schools (CCPS) Chief School Improvement Officer. As Superintendent, Dr. Beasley helps administer one of the top 100 largest school districts in the nation and the fifth largest school system in the state of Georgia with approximately 55,000 students, 7,300 employees, and nearly 70 learning sites and educational programs.

Dr. Beasley holds a Bachelor of Science degree in Mathematics from the University of Montevallo and a Master of Science degree in Mathematics Education from Samford University. In addition, Dr. Beasley holds an Educational Specialist as well as a Doctorate degree in Education with an emphasis on Educational Leadership from Samford University. He has also completed Harvard University’s Public Educational Leadership Program.

Previous Superintendents 
Mr. Ernest Stroud (1970-1986)
Mr. Joe Lovin (1987-1989)
Mr. Bob Livingston (1990-1994)
Mr. Joe Hairston (1995- 2000)
Mr. Dan Colwell - (January 2000 - April 2003)
Mr. William Chavis - Interim (April 2003 - January 2004)
Dr. Barbara Pulliam (February 2004 - July 2007)
Dr. Gloria Duncan - Interim (July 2007 - March 2008)
Mr. John Thompson (April 2008 - March 2009)
Ms. Valya Lee - Interim (March 2009 - June 2009)
Mr. Ed Heatley (July 2009- September 2012)
Ms. Luvenia Jackson (September 2012 - June 2017)

High schools

These high schools are located in Clayton County.

Middle schools
These middle schools are located in Clayton County.

Elementary schools 
These elementary schools are located in Clayton County.

References

External links 
 https://nces.ed.gov/Programs/Edge/ACSDashboard/1301230
 Clayton County Public Schools website
Georgia Department of Education: College and Career Ready Performance Index Report
The Governor's Office of Student Achievement Report Card

Education in Clayton County, Georgia
School districts in Georgia (U.S. state)